The Rotumans are a Polynesian ethnic group native to Rotuma, an island group forming part of Fiji. The island itself is a cultural melting pot at the crossroads of the Micronesian, Melanesian and Polynesian divisions of the Pacific Ocean, and due to the seafaring nature of traditional Pacific cultures, the indigenous Rotuman have adopted or share many aspects of its multifaceted culture with its Melanesian, Micronesian and Polynesian neighbours.

Ancestors
The first inhabitants of the island of Rotuma were from Borabora/ Tahiti. They were the ancient seafaring people that sailed from modern-day Taiwan originally, followed by waves of Micronesians and Melanesians, giving Rotumans a similar but thoroughly distinct language, cultural heritage and metaphysical understanding to that of their preceding parent cultures.

After the invasion of Rotuma i.e.overthrowing the Tahitians by the Samoans. They created a Rotuman mythology pointing to Samoans as the first people to inhabit the island of Rotuma. But this was made up due to the great Samoan / Fijian and Tongan expansion. The most prominent creation myth speaks of Raho, a Samoan prince who, shamed by his family, sought a new home with his daughters. He travelled across the Pacific in his canoe, and when he came to a spot with two protruding rocks, poured baskets of sand from Samoa over the rocks, forming the islands of Rotuma.

Physical appearance
By most accounts, Rotumans are closely related to their neighbours from Samoa, Tonga and Tahiti. Rotumans are generally noted as being of a light olive to medium brown complexion, with generally wavy black hair, although some individuals have naturally copper-ginger colouring to their hair. Traditionally, men kept their hair shoulder length or longer; however, post-colonial Rotumans look unfavorably on this. They are on average shorter than their Tongan or Samoan neighbours, and less prone to obesity.

The appearance of some individuals more clearly indicates Tahitian (French Polynesia) heritage evidenced by darker skin and curlier hair, and some people show decidedly Native American facial characteristics, such as long, oval-shaped eyes and straight hair.

Rotuman people can point to at least one white ancestor (usually from England or the United States) since European arrival. This can be attributed to the high ratio of whites to Rotumans in the early days of exposure to white people, when Rotuma became a haven to mutineers and stow-aways who appreciated the beauty of the island and found prosperity as the trading advisers to local chiefs when dealing with Occidental ships.

Rotuman society
Rotuman society is one based more on democracy than most other Pacific cultures. While somewhat stratified, Rotuman culture maintains no class distinctions such as in Fijian or Tongan systems, no noble caste, and no sense of primogeniture. The strength of Rotuman society is the high communal nature of activities. Every Rotuman person maintains a strong affinity for their community, and this is evidenced through participation in large-scale projects (kato'aga) and communal property, such as for agriculture. Rotuman society can be divided, in the broadest sense, into seven itu'u, or districts, each of which is headed up by a male chief, referred to as "gagaj 'es itu'u". It is his role to guide the community's communal works, and represent his constituents as a member of the Rotuma Island Council (RIC).

Rotumans as a Pacific people
Rotumans are Polynesians by most accounts, physically most resemble the Polynesian people of Tahiti, Samoa and Tonga. These three races are commonly attributed in Rotuman mythology as the true parent civilisations.  But Rotuman musical tradition prior to European and Central Polynesian influence consisted primarily of chanting similar to traditional Tahitian or Maori styles (see Tautoga and Himene), both very distant cultures.  In addition, many of characteristics of the Rotuman language distance it from Polynesian neighbours and align it more closely with Melanesian (particularly Western Fijian) languages.

References

Further reading
 "Rotuma." in The Pacific Islands: An Encyclopedia. Ed. by Brij V. Lal and Kate Fortune. Honolulu: University of Hawai'i Press. p. 568–569.

Rotuma